XHJK-FM is a radio station on 102.1 FM in Delicias, Chihuahua. The station is owned by Sigma Radio and carries a romantic music format.

History
XHJK began as XEJK-AM on June 1, 1949. It broadcast on 1340 kHz and was owned by La Voz de Delicias, S.A. By the 1990s, it was owned by Grupo ACIR; it moved down to 980 kHz at the same time.

XEJK migrated to FM in 2011.

References

Radio stations in Chihuahua